Sportsklubben Forward is a sports club in Oslo, Norway, which is primarily known for its ice hockey department.

History
The club was founded on September 25, 1915. The ice hockey department was one of the founding members of the Hovedserien, the top level of Norwegian ice hockey, in the 1934–35 season. The team regularly participated in the highest-level ice hockey leagues until after the 1985–86 season. They won a total of eight Norwegian championships, second only to Vålerenga Ishockey, from 1946–1964. From 1948–1971, they were known as Gamlebyen IF, before becoming SK Forward again. Forward currently competes in the 4. divisjon, the fifth level of Norwegian ice hockey.

The association has also had bandy, football, and handball departments. The bandy team won the Norwegian Bandy Premier League in 1928.

Achievements

Bandy
Norwegian champion (1): 1928

Ice hockey 
Norwegian champion (8): 1946, 1950, 1953, 1955, 1956, 1958, 1959, 1964

External links
 Official website

Ice hockey teams in Norway
Defunct bandy clubs in Norway
Defunct football clubs in Norway
Defunct athletics clubs in Norway
Sport in Oslo
Bandy clubs established in 1915
Sports clubs established in 1915
1915 establishments in Norway